A Broadway Cowboy is a 1920 American silent Western comedy film directed by Joseph Franz and starring William Desmond. It was distributed by Pathé Exchange.

Plot
As described in a film magazine, Betty Jordan (Francisco), daughter of a Montana banker, is in the East attending boarding school and falls desperately in love with Burke Randolph (Desmond), a matinee idol, who performs valiant deeds behind the footlights each night in the title role of an old-fashioned melodrama, The Western Knight.

She is expelled from school after Burke treats a chaperon rather roughly during an automobile ride. When Betty returns home to Montana, Sheriff Pat McGann (Delmar), who is in love with her, finds a picture she has of Burke in his cowboy suit, and in a fit of jealousy sends copies of it out to the other neighboring sheriffs with the request that Burke be arrested on sight.

When his show hits a small western town, Burke is arrested. He manages to escape, and in a series of exciting incidents accidentally captures four desperadoes who in the prior night had robbed Betty's father's bank. Burke is proclaimed as a hero and wins Betty as his bride.

Cast

Preservation status
 The film is preserved at Filmmuseum Nederlands (EYE Institut).

References

External links

 
 
 Lantern slide

1920 films
Films based on short fiction
1920 Western (genre) films
American black-and-white films
Pathé Exchange films
Films directed by Joseph Franz
Silent American Western (genre) films
Films with screenplays by George H. Plympton
1920s American films
Silent American comedy films